The Forst Zinna rail disaster occurred 19 January 1988 in Forst Zinna, East Germany. It was the result of a collision between a Soviet T-64A and an express train on the Berlin–Halle railway. 6 were killed, 33 injured. It was one of the worst train accidents in the history of the GDR. Soviet military often used this area for tank training.

Disaster 
The train involved in the accident was a DR Class 211 006 pulling 12 passenger cars and a restaurant car. The other vehicle involved was a T-64A tank. The driver of the T-64A was 19 years old and undergoing training by a 20 year old instructor. This was the first time driving the tank, and it was dark outside. The instructor called the trainee to turn right, however, this was not heard by the driver, who did not realise they were heading towards the busy rail line. When the instructor's emergency engine shutdown switch finally activated, the tank became stuck on the rail line. As the crew heard the sound of an oncoming train, they abandoned the tank. Seconds later, the train collided with the tank at 110km/h. The collision instantly killed both drivers of the train, pushing the tank 130 meters forward.

Aftermath 
The soldiers were initially arrested and questioned by the Kriminalpolizei, an unprecedented event at that time, potentially as a result of disagreements between the policies of Erich Honecker and Mikhail Gorbachev. The police report directly blamed the Soviets, concluding that the train driver would not have been able to stop the train in time. However, the soldiers were nonetheless tried by a military tribunal of the Soviet Army and it was rumoured that the two had been executed.

This area would later have dragon's teeth added to the areas near the rail track to prevent further incidents of tanks crossing onto the rail line.

See also
 Lists of rail accidents

References

External links
 Photos of disaster

Railway accidents in 1988
1988 in East Germany
East Germany–Soviet Union relations
Accidents and incidents involving Deutsche Reichsbahn
Railway accidents and incidents in Germany